When the Spanish arrived in the central Colombian highlands, the region was organized into the Muisca Confederation, which had two rulers; the zipa was the ruler of the southern part and based in Muyquytá. The hoa was the ruler of the northern area and based in Hunza, known today as Tunja.

Organization 
Psihipqua and hoa were the titles given to these rulers of the ancient confederation. Neither exercised absolute power, not rigid or strict control over those to whom they owed their power, so that they can be considered kings. However, these positions of power were of great honor and were surrounded by a rather elaborate ceremony. The position of the psihipqua was such that not even the members of the nobility dared to look him in the face, and it is said if the psihipqua needed to spit, someone would hold out a piece of rich cloth for him to spit on, because it would be sacrilegious for anything so precious as his saliva to touch the ground. Whoever held the cloth (all the while carefully looking the other way) then carried it off to be reverently disposed of.

The psihipqua was also given the responsibility of offering gold to the gods. He would cover himself with gold and float out on a royal barge to the middle of the sacred Lake Guatavita, where he would offer up golden trinkets. This is widely believed to be how the legend of El Dorado started.

When Gonzalo Jiménez de Quesada arrived in the Muisca territories the ruling psihipqua was Bogotá and the hoa was Eucaneme.

Non-patrilineal heritage of rule 
The position of the ruler was inherited, but the line of succession was not patrilineal. Instead, the king was succeeded by his nephew, the oldest son of his oldest sister. There were exceptions, and the ruler's subjects, apparently, had some say in the matter, if only to confirm the successor in his post.

Zaque

Zipa

Other rulers

See also 

Spanish conquest of the Muisca
Muisca
Muisca Confederation

References 

 
History of Colombia
Titles of national or ethnic leadership